The Stonecoast MFA Program in Creative Writing is a graduate program in creative writing based at the University of Southern Maine  in Portland, Maine, United States.  Stonecoast enrolls approximately 100 students in four major genres: creative nonfiction, fiction, poetry, and popular fiction.  Other areas of student interest, including literary translation, performance, writing for stage and screen, writing Nature, and cross-genre writing, are pursued as elective options.  Students also choose one track that focuses an intensive research project in their third semester from among these categories: craft, creative collaboration, literary theory, publishing, social justice/community service, and teaching/pedagogy. Stonecoast is one of only two graduate creative writing programs in the country offering a degree in popular fiction. It is accredited through the New England Association of Schools and Colleges (NEASC).

The Stonecoast MFA program is a low-residency program. Ten-day residencies for students, faculty, and visiting writers are held each January and June. Each semester, a group of ten students also goes to Ireland for a smaller residency. Residencies involve an intensive schedule of workshops, classes, readings, and gatherings. The rest of a student's academic work during the two-year program is pursued on a one-on-one basis under the leadership of a faculty mentor.

Founded in 2002 by Barbara Lee Hope, Ken Rosen, and Dianne Benedict, Stonecoast came to national prominence under the direction of poet Annie Finch who served as director from 2004 to 2013. Stonecoast is one of the oldest and best-known of the second wave of low-residency graduate programs in creative writing, following on the first wave of the Warren Wilson, Goddard, and Bennington graduate programs. Stonecoast departed from its predecessor programs in a number of significant ways including more flexibility in cross-genre work, more student input into mentor choice and curriculum, seminar-style classes as opposed to lectures, and more flexibility in third-semester projects. The program received coverage in The Atlantic Monthly feature on MFA programs focusing in particular on its Ireland residency and popular fiction component. Other innovative curricular features include a foundation workshop in poetic meter for incoming poets and student-initiated elective workshops on special topics in writing.

Stonecoast has been ranked consistently among the "Top Ten Low-Residency Programs" by Poets & Writers magazine since 2011.

History
History:
1980	The Stonecoast Summer Writers’ Conference founded at University of Southern Maine, held in the John Calvin Stevens-designed Stone House in Freeport, Maine
2002 	The Stonecoast Low Residency MFA in Creative Writing is developed
2004	Poet Annie Finch hired as Director
2005 	Stonecoast in Ireland program launched
2011 Stonecoast is ranked among the "Top Ten Low-Residency MFA Programs" in the first set of low-residency rankings by Poets & Writers magazine.
2013  Fiction writer Justin Tussing appointed Interim Director  
2015  University of Southern Maine gives up ownership of the Stone House and moves Stonecoast MFA residencies to the Harraseeket Inn in Freeport for the winter and the campus of Bowdoin College in Brunswick for the summer.

Faculty
The Stonecoast MFA faculty has won numerous awards including Guggenheim and National Endowment for the Arts grants, Astraea, Hugo, Lambda, and Hurston/Wright Legacy awards, a Lannan Foundation Grant, the American Book Award, and the Whiting Writer's Award. Visiting writers and past faculty have included publishers Jonathan Galassi, Kate Gale, and April Ossmann, novelists Jeffrey Ford, Ray Gonzalez, Tayari Jones, Kelly Link, and Leslea Newman,  literary scholars Christopher Ricks and Marie Borroff, social critic James Howard Kunstler, storyteller Gioia Timpanelli, and poets Maxine Kumin, Marilyn Nelson, Ted Kooser, Joan Retallack, Alicia Ostriker, and Reginald Shepherd. Current faculty include Tony Barnstone, Rick Bass, Jeanne Marie Beaumont, Sarah Braunstein, Breena Clarke, Jaed Muncharoen Coffin, Susan Conley, Ted Deppe, Carolina De Robertis, Boman Desai, David Anthony Durham, Martín Espada, Theodora Goss, Aaron Hamburger, Elizabeth Hand, Nancy Holder, Barbara Hurd, Cait Johnson, James Patrick Kelly, Michael Kimball, Debra Marquart, David Mura, Alexs Pate, Dolen Perkins-Valdez, Eléna Rivera, Elizabeth Searle, Tim Seibles, and Suzanne Strempek Shea.

Alumni
Stonecoast MFA alumni include Cave Canem Prize Winner Indigo Moor; Rona Jaffe Award winner Melanie Drane; National Poetry Series winner and National Book Award Finalist Patricia Smith; Wick First Book Poetry Prize winner Joanna Solfrian; and novelists Diane Les Becquets, Alexs Pate, Morgan Callan Rogers, and Colin Sargent; produced film and television writers Debbie Daughetee, Mike Langworthy, Matthew Quinn Martin and Bix Skahill; popular fiction writers Patrick Bagley, Libby Cudmore, Laura Navarre, Michaela Roessner-Herman, Kevin St. Jarre, and J. M. McDermott; poets Quenton Baker, Roger Bonair-Agard, Cindy Gutierrez, Jeanette Lynes, Nylah Lyman, Josh Davis, and Karrie Waarala; and creative nonfiction writers Jaed Munchaeroen Coffin, Kim Dana Kupperman and Penelope Schwartz Robinson (winner of the Stonecoast Book Prize judged by Katha Pollitt).

The Stonecoast Alumni Association, open to all Stonecoast alumni, sponsors readings and literary events around the country.

References

Sources
 University of Southern Maine > Stonecoast MFA in Creative Writing Program Website
 NewPages.com: Good Reading Starts Here: Creative Writing Programs List

External links
 * [http://www.stonecoastfacultyblog.com Stonecoast Faculty Blog]]
 Stonecoast Community Blog
 Wolfe's Neck Woods State Park
 Videos: Stonecoast MFA Channel

Creative writing programs
American writers' organizations
University of Southern Maine